Kittentail is a common name for several plants and may refer to:

Synthyris species, especially:
Synthyris missurica, native to the Pacific Northwest of North America
Veronica bullii, native to the Upper Midwest of North America